The Continental CD-230 is a four-cylinder, horizontally opposed aircraft Diesel engine produced by Continental Motors, Inc.
The engine received its type certificate from the US Federal Aviation Administration on December 19, 2012, under the official TD-300-B designation.
A later revision adds the TD-300-C with a higher critical altitude.

Design and development
In 2008, Teledyne Continental's new president, Rhett Ross, announced that the company is very concerned about future availability of 100LL avgas, and as a result will develop a Diesel engine in the  range for certification in 2009 or 2010.

Rather than develop a new Diesel engine from scratch, Continental decided to license an existing design to develop. The company did not release details on which engine they licensed, but the aviation media have identified it as the French SMA SR305-230 engine.

Specifications (CD-230)

See also

References

External links

 
 
 

2010s aircraft piston engines
TD-300
Aircraft diesel engines